Dirk Krüger is a German economist and currently Walter H. and Leonore C. Annenberg Professor in the Social Sciences and Professor of Economics at the University of Pennsylvania. He holds a secondary appointment at the Wharton School. His research focuses on macroeconomic risk, public finance and labor economics.

Education 
Krüger studied for his diploma in economics at Bielefeld University as a scholar of the Friedrich Ebert Foundation. After graduating in 1995, he went on to further study at the University of Minnesota and received his Ph.D. in 1999.

Career 
Stanford University hired him as an assistant professor of economics in 1999. He was a Hoover Fellow at the Stanford-based Hoover Institution from 2002 to 2003. He left Stanford for an assistant professorship at the University of Pennsylvania in 2003. He then worked as a full professor at the Goethe University Frankfurt from 2004 to 2006, when he returned to the University of Pennsylvania as an associate professor. He was promoted to full professorship in 2008.

Krüger has worked for a range of academic journals in an editorial capacity, such as the Review of Economic Studies, the American Economic Review and the International Economic Review.

The Econometric Society elected him fellow in 2020. He is also a fellow of the European Economic Association.

Selected works

References

External links 
 Profile on the website of the University of Pennsylvania

Year of birth missing (living people)
German economists
Bielefeld University alumni
University of Minnesota alumni
Stanford University faculty
Academic staff of Goethe University Frankfurt
University of Pennsylvania faculty
Fellows of the Econometric Society
Living people
Fellows of the European Economic Association